Hueneme may refer to:

 Port Hueneme, California, coastal city in Ventura County
 Port of Hueneme, deep-water harbor